Symonds is a census-designated place and unincorporated community located in Bolivar County, Mississippi, United States. Symonds is located on the former Yazoo and Mississippi Valley Railroad.

A post office operated under the name Symonds from 1905 to 1954.

It was first named as a CDP in the 2020 Census which listed a population of 72.

Demographics

2020 census

Note: the US Census treats Hispanic/Latino as an ethnic category. This table excludes Latinos from the racial categories and assigns them to a separate category. Hispanics/Latinos can be of any race.

Education
Symonds is in the West Bolivar Consolidated School District. It was in the pre-merger West Bolivar School District The west Bolivar districts merged in 2014. The pre-merger West Bolivar schools include West Bolivar Elementary School and West Bolivar High School. Previously West Bolivar Middle School was a distinct school.

References

Unincorporated communities in Bolivar County, Mississippi
Unincorporated communities in Mississippi
Census-designated places in Bolivar County, Mississippi